The 21st Mixed Aviation Division (Serbo-Croatian: 21. mešovita vazduhoplovna divizija/ 21. мешовита ваздухопловна дивизија) was a Yugoslav Air Force unit established in 1949.

History

The 21st Mixed Aviation Division was formed in 1949 due to the plan of the expansion of Yugoslav Air Force formation.

It was an independent unit under direct command of Air Force HQ. In 1950 the division was attached to 3rd Aviation Corps.

It was disbanded by the order from June 27, 1959, year per the "Drvar" reorganization plan. It was transformed into 9th Air Command.

The commanders of division were August Canjko, Blažo Kovačević, Milenko Lipovščak and Radoje Ljubičić. Commissars were Vukota Radović and Pero Žarković until 1953.

Assignments
Command of Yugoslav Air Force (1949-1950)
3rd Aviation Corps (1949–1959)

Organization

1949-1959
21st Mixed Aviation Assault/Fighter-Bomber Division
Training Squadron of 21st Aviation Division (1953–1954, 1957-1959)
122nd Hydroplane Liaison Squadron (1951–1959)
83rd Fighter (Fighter-Bomber) Aviation Regiment 
97th Bomber Aviation Regiment
172nd Fighter (Fighter-Bomber) Aviation Regiment (1949–1958)
204th Fighter Aviation Regiment (1949-1950)
84th Air Base (1953–1959)

Headquarters
Mostar (1949-1959)

Commanding officers
Colonel August Canjko	
Colonel Blažo Kovačević	
Colonel Milenko Lipovščak	
Colonel Radoje Ljubičić

Political commissars
Colonel Vukota Radović	
Colonel Pero Žarković

References

Divisions of Yugoslav Air Force
Military units and formations established in 1949
Military units and formations disestablished in 1959